Patelloida corticata is a species of sea snail or true limpet, a marine gastropod mollusc in the family Lottiidae, the lottia limpets.

References

 Powell A. W. B., William Collins Publishers Ltd, Auckland 1979 

Lottiidae
Gastropods of New Zealand
Taxa named by Frederick Hutton (scientist)
Gastropods described in 1880